Dimorphocoma is a genus of flowering plants in the family Asteraceae.

There is only one known species, Dimorphocoma minutula, endemic to Australia (New South Wales and South Australia).

References

Monotypic Asteraceae genera
Astereae
Endemic flora of Australia
Taxa named by Ferdinand von Mueller